Mikko Johannes Halvari (born March 4, 1983 in Porvoo) is a Finnish decathlete. He won a bronze medal for his category at the 2002 IAAF World Junior Championships in Kingston, Jamaica, with a solid score of 7,587 points. He is also a full-time member of Tuusulanjärven Urheilijat, a local track and field club in Tuusula, and is coached and trained by Jussi Välimäki.

At age twenty-five, Halvari made his official debut for the 2008 Summer Olympics in Beijing, where he competed in men's decathlon. During the event, he set a personal best of 1.93 metres in the high jump; however, he failed to clear a height in the pole vault, which cost him a chance for a medal. In the end, Halvari finished only in twenty-sixth place, with a total score of 6,486 points.

Personal bests

References

External links

Profile – Suomen Olympiakomitea 
NBC 2008 Olympics profile

Finnish decathletes
Living people
Olympic athletes of Finland
Athletes (track and field) at the 2008 Summer Olympics
People from Porvoo
1983 births
Sportspeople from Uusimaa